Nikolay Yevgeniyevich Larionov (born 19 January 1957, in Volkhov) is a Russian former football player and current manager. As of 2009, he is an assistant coach with the reserves team of FC Zenit St. Petersburg.

Honours
 Soviet Top League winner: 1984.

International career
Larionov made his debut for USSR on March 23, 1983 in a friendly against France. He scored 2 goals for the national team, including a goal against Portugal in a UEFA Euro 1984 qualifier. He participated in the 1986 FIFA World Cup.

External links
 RST
 KLISF
 SPD

1957 births
Living people
People from Volkhov
Russian footballers
Soviet footballers
Soviet Union international footballers
Soviet expatriate footballers
Russian expatriate footballers
Soviet expatriate sportspeople in Sweden
Expatriate footballers in Sweden
Expatriate footballers in Finland
1986 FIFA World Cup players
FC Dynamo Saint Petersburg players
FC Zenit Saint Petersburg players
Soviet Top League players
Russian football managers
Association football midfielders
Association football defenders
GBK Kokkola players
Sportspeople from Leningrad Oblast